KCVP may refer to:

 KCVP-LP, a defunct low-power television station (channel 34) formerly licensed to Clovis, New Mexico, United States
 Kannada Chalavali Vatal Paksha, Indian political party